Azrak may refer to:
 Azrak, Khuzestan
 Azrak, Mazandaran